Longformacus House is a mansion near the village of Longformacus,  Scottish Borders, Scotland.

History
The estate was once owned by the Earls of Moray and then the Earls of Dunbar before passing to the Sinclair family. A castle may have existed at the site prior to the current mansion house.

Robert Sinclair of Longformacus built the current mansion house in the early 18th century. A plaque shows the inscription "Adam delin" by the Scottish architect William Adam.

References

Clan Sinclair
Listed buildings in the Scottish Borders